Nail Polish is a Pakistani drama serial aired on A-Plus Entertainment. It is directed by Kaleem Rajput and produced by Abid Hassan. The debuting Rahma Ali is featured in the lead role, while Humaira Ali, Usman Peerzada, Abdullah Ejaz and Tehseen Wajahat Chishti portray supporting roles. The drama started airing on 3 March 2011 and ended on 12 May 2011. It was a weekly television serial that airs every Thursday.

Plot
Sonia (Rahma Ali) is a young girl who studies in college and belongs to a poor family living in a small town called Khaddepur. One day, while going to her college, she gets involved in a car accident and the car is driven by Naveed (Abdullah Ijaz), the driver of a famous and influential fashion designer Nafisa Mehboob (Humaira Ali). Nafisa tells Naveed to apologize to Sonia. Sonia learns that Nafisa is a fashion designer and wants to work at her beauty parlor. Sonia is a rude girl, who just wants enjoyment in her life and begins contacting Naveed and also starts visiting Nafisa to get a job at the beauty parlor. However, Sonia's happy life is ruined when she discovers that the people who she is living with are not her parents and realises that the woman who grew her up is not her mother and has stolen her from hospital. The young Sonia starts disobeying her mother. She starts getting involved in this controversial fashion industry in hopes of becoming an upcoming model.

Cast
Rahma Ali as Sonia
Humaira Ali as Nafisa Mehboob
Usman Peerzada as Bedaar Alam
Abdullah Ejaz as Naveed
Ismat Iqbal
Faiza Gillani
Tehseen Wajahat Chishti as Goshe Pehlwan

Production

The drama is directed by Kaleem Rajput and is produced by Abid Hassan. The official title track of the drama is sung by Sam and Tehseen Wajahat Chishti, who is also working in the drama as Goshe Pehlwan.

References

Pakistani drama television series
2011 Pakistani television series debuts
2011 Pakistani television series endings
Urdu-language television shows
A-Plus TV original programming